"The Gypsy Cried" is a song written by Twyla Herbert & Lou Christie, using his actual name Lugee Sacco, which was released by Lou Christie as a single in 1962. The name "Lou Christie" was chosen by C & C Records, and "The Gypsy Cried" was credited to "Lou Christie" before they had consulted with Sacco about the name.

The song was the first song that Herbert and Christie wrote together, written over a period of 15 minutes, and was Lou Christie's first hit. The song was initially released by Pittsburgh-based C & C Records, and was a local hit in Pittsburgh, but it was soon picked up by Roulette Records and became a national hit. The song was released on Lou Christie's eponymous album in 1963.

The song spent 13 weeks on the Billboard Hot 100 chart, peaking at No. 24 on March 16, 1963, while reaching No. 18 on the Cash Box Top 100, and No. 3 on Canada's CHUM Hit Parade.

References

1962 songs
1962 singles
1963 singles
Songs written by Lou Christie
Songs written by Twyla Herbert